Air Commodore Arthur Dwight Ross  (18 March 1907 – 27 September 1981) was a Royal Canadian Air Force (RCAF) Base Commander of No. 62 Base, No. 6 Group RCAF in Yorkshire, England during the Second World War. Ross received the George Cross for his actions on the night of 27/28 June 1944 at RAF Tholthorpe.

Early life and career
Arthur Dwight Ross was born 18 March 1907, in Winnipeg, Manitoba, Canada. After graduating from the Royal Military College of Canada in Kingston, Ontario in 1928 (student # 1815), he took a commission in the Royal Canadian Air Force. Ross received his pilot's wings at Camp Borden in February 1929.

Second World War
After a few years of aerial surveying and staffing work, Ross was appointed commander of No. 5 (Bomber Reconnaissance) Squadron on Canada's east coast in 1939 where he flew on anti-submarine and convoy escort operations.

From August 1940 to March 1942, he worked with the British Commonwealth Air Training Plan as the officer commanding No. 3 Service Flying Training School (SFTS), at Currie Field in Calgary, Alberta.

In December 1942, Ross became the Commanding Officer at RAF Middleton St. George. In February 1944 he was promoted from Group Captain to Air Commodore and was assigned to command No. 62 Base, No. 6 Group RCAF, headquartered at RAF Linton-on-Ouse. While visiting the base's sub-station at RAF Tholthorpe, an incident occurred which earned Ross the George Cross, the highest gallantry award for civilians as well as for military personnel in actions which are not in the face of the enemy. The incident also resulted in awards being earned by other personnel.

George Cross
During the night of 27/28 June 1944, an RCAF Halifax aircraft of 425 Squadron was returning from a bombing raid on a flying bomb launching site in northern France. The aircraft struggled back on three engines. Upon landing, the pilot, Sergeant M.J.P. Lavoie, lost control and veered his aircraft into a parked Halifax which was fully loaded with fuel and bombs. The George Cross citation explains the incident in detail:

Ross's George Cross citation reads:

Postwar
From 1945 to 1948, Ross commanded the RCAF Staff College in Toronto, Ontario. Until 1961, Ross was Air Commander of the Western Atlantic Area's Canadian Atlantic sub-area of NATO's Allied Command Atlantic. This command's purpose was to keep the sea lanes open between the United States and Europe during the Cold War.

Tributes
An air cadet squadron based in Kingston, Ontario bears his name (No. 58 Air Commodore A. Dwight Ross, GC, CBE, CD Royal Canadian Air Cadet Squadron).

Dwight Ross School in Greenwood, Nova Scotia is also named after him.

See also

List of Royal Military College of Canada people
List of George Cross recipients

References

 Coughlin, Tom. The Dangerous Sky. Toronto: The Ryerson Press., 1968. No ISBN.
 Roberts, Leslie. There Shall Be Wings. Toronto: Clark, Irwin and Co. Ltd., 1959. No ISBN.
 Alumni Profile on Arthur Dwight Ross in e-Veritas
 Profile from Airforce.ca Retrieved: 2012-08-12

External links
 No. 58 Air Commodore A. Dwight Ross, GC, CBE, CD Royal Canadian Air Cadet Squadron

|-

1907 births
1981 deaths
Canadian recipients of the George Cross
Canadian Commanders of the Order of the British Empire
Royal Canadian Air Force officers
Royal Military College of Canada alumni
Royal Canadian Air Force personnel of World War II
Canadian military personnel from Manitoba